Marchand Ennery was a French rabbi; brother of Jonas Ennery; born in Nancy 1792; died in Paris 21 August 1852; studied Talmud under Baruch Guggenheim and at the rabbinical school of Herz Scheuer, in Mainz. He went to Paris, became teacher in the family of a wealthy coreligionist, and in 1819 was appointed director of the new Jewish school at Nancy. At this time he published his Hebrew-French lexicon, the first of its kind to appear in France. In 1829 he became chief rabbi of Paris; in 1846 chief rabbi of the Central Consistory; in 1850 chevalier of the Legion of Honor. He was succeeded as chief rabbi by Salomon Ulmann.

Publications 
 Dictionnaire hébreu-français (first edition: 1827), Colbo, 1981
 Dictionnaire de la Bible hébraïque, Colbo, 1996, 
 Lexique hébreu-français, Durlacher, Paris, 1949

Bibliography 
 Histoire des Juifs en France, under the direction of Bernhard Blumenkranz, Privat, 1972
 Dictionnaire biographique des rabbins et autres ministres du culte israélite; France et Algérie, du Grand Sanhédrin (1807) à la loi de Séparation(1905) - Berg International Éditeurs, Paris, 2007, notice E37, pages 283–285.

References

Clergy from Nancy, France
1792 births
1852 deaths
French lexicographers
Chevaliers of the Légion d'honneur
19th-century French rabbis
French Hebraists
Chief rabbis of France
Burials at Père Lachaise Cemetery
19th-century lexicographers
Writers from Nancy, France